Dominica has competed at every edition of the Pan American Games since the thirteenth edition of the multi-sport event in 1995, having won two silver and one bronze medals. Dominica did not compete at the first and only Pan American Winter Games in 1990.

Medal count

Medals by sport

References